Adapazarı-Gebze power plant is a gas-fired power station in Sakarya Province northwestern Turkey.

Consisting of 3 equal sized close together units, all opened in 2002, it is licensed as 2 power plants namely Gebze (2 units licence number EÜ/8154-3/04120) and Adapazarı (1 unit licence number EÜ/8154-4/04121).

References 

Natural gas-fired power stations in Turkey
Buildings and structures in Sakarya Province